St. Benedict's College (Sinhala: සාන්ත බෙනඩික්  විදුහල, Tamil: புனித ஆசீர்வாதப்பர்  கல்லூரி) is a Catholic school located in the Kotahena area of Colombo, Sri Lanka.

History 

The school was founded in 1838 by the Diocese of Ceylon as Kottanchina Seminary. St. Benedict's College, the oldest Roman Catholic school in Sri Lanka, was inaugurated in 1865 by Silvestro Benedictine monks. The school consisted of a few classrooms and small staff at first. 

In 1868, the De La Salle Brothers assumed administration of the college. They renamed it to St. Benedict's College.Since then, the school has been administered by many brothers who belong to the La Sallian Community.

The past Directors of the College include Bro. Austin Anthony, Bro. Glastian Oliver, Bro. Alban Patrick, Bro. Athanace Charles, Bro. Osmund Gregory, Bro. Alexander Cyrilus, Bro. Granville Perera and Bro. Anselm Calixtus.

Administration

The college is currently led by Rev. Bro. Pubudu Rajapakshe. It enrolls approximately 2,400 students with a staff of over 200 teachers. Students range from Grade 1 to Grade 13 (see Education in Sri Lanka), studying in English, Sinhala, and Tamil media.

Campus 

The premises are adjacent to St. Lucia's Cathedral. The Main Building, the Reverend Brothers Luke, Alexander, and James Memorial Buildings, the Reverrend Brother Granville Perera Aquatic Centre, The Main Hall Building, and Longstanding Clock Tower (built during the English Colonial Era) complete the College. Academic facilities are provided throughout the college in combination with co-curricular and extra-curricular facilities.

The college prefects' board consists of 50 students who are selected for their all-around performance and contributions towards the college. The prefects make themselves available for many activities such as special events, occasions, general assemblies, and day-to-day discipline.

The college section consists of the main hall, buildings named after Reverend Brother James, Reverend Brother. Alexander and Reverend Brother Luke, a library, three computer laboratories, a lecture hall, physics, biology, and chemistry laboratories, three music and art rooms, and a language centre.

Primary

The primary is physically separated from the college section headed by Rev. Bro. Praveen Vaaz. The 60-member staff provides education to around 1000 students in fields of the academy, sports arts, and music.

The primary section consists of two main buildings with up to 40 classes, a library, language unit, computer laboratory, music hall, basketball court and arts room. The primary prefects board consists of 20 prefects who attend all school occasions and discipline the younger students. Additionally, the Primary students are given opportunities to  participate in scouting, choir and sports.

Sports

Since opening in 1865, St, Benedict's has actively participated in island sports; especially football, basketball, hockey and cricket and have been national champions for all four of these sports. The College had the All-Island Champion Cricket team in 1964/65 and was the first school to introduce rugby to the educational sector in the country. It became All-Island Athletic Champion in 2008, All-Island Football Champion in 2006, 2007, and 2008, All-Island Basketball Champion in 2006 & 2009 and All-Island Hockey Champion in 2007. 

The College owns a Gymnasium and a Sports-Hostel. The grounds on Bloemendhal Road consist of cricket pitches and turf, rugby fields, football fields, hockey facilities, and provides facilities for other various athletics.

Within college premises, the college has two basketball courts; one of which is lit for night games. A swimming pool with viewing facilities was added in 2010.

St. Benedict's Primary is the first primary section of a school in the country to have its own basketball court. It offers table tennis in addition to the main sports of cricket, tennis, and swimming.

Old Boys 

The Old Boys of St. Benedict's College, an organisation of former students, have played a role in the affairs and ventures of the college since 1904. The Loyal Old Bens have been instrumental in projects, functions and special events.

Notable alumini

See also
:Category:Alumni of St. Benedict's College, Colombo

References

External links
Old Ben's Alumni Association of United Kingdom
Old Ben's Alumni Association of New York
SBC Old Boys Association - British Columbia, Canada

1865 establishments in Ceylon
Boys' schools in Sri Lanka
Educational institutions established in 1865
Catholic secondary schools in Sri Lanka
Schools in Colombo
Colombo